Diving at the 2013 Canada Summer Games was in Sherbrooke, Quebec at the Universite de Sherbrooke.  It was held from 4 to 17 August.  There were four events of diving.

Medal table
The following is the medal table for diving at the 2013 Canada Summer Games.

Diving

Men's

Women's

References

External links 

2013 Canada Summer Games
2013 in diving
2013 Canada Games